Galatas is a village and a community in western Chalkeia, Nafpaktia, Aetolia-Acarnania, Greece located at 14 m above sea level. According to the 2011 census, the village had 976 inhabitants, and the community, which includes the village Kryoneri, had 1,070 inhabitants.

Geography
Galatas sits at the foot of the mountain Varasova, at the left bank of the river Evinos. It lies 2 km east of Evinochori, 11 km east of Missolonghi, 18 km west of Antirrio and 25 km west of Nafpaktos. The Greek National Road 5 (Patras-Antirrio-Agrinio-Ioannina) and the Motorway 5 pass north of the village.

History
Galatas had its own train station on the currently abandoned railway line from the port of Kryoneri to Agrinio via Missolonghi and Stamna. Between 1912 and 1997, Galatas was an independent community. In 1997, the village became part of the municipality of Chalkeia, which became part of the new municipality of Nafpaktia in 2011.

Historical population

References

External links
History of Galatas, at Galatas' website 

Populated places in Aetolia-Acarnania
Nafpaktia